Gargamel! is an American rock band from Orlando, Florida. Their music has its foundations in funk metal, but this is frequently combined with widely divergent styles, often to comic effect. Gargamel! is always spelled with an exclamation point.

Band history
The band Gargamel! has been touring the south (primarily Florida, Georgia and Carolinas) for over 15 years. They have been featured on numerous indie films and compilations.  During that time they released 4 studio CD's and 2 live DVD's. Gargamel! won the Orlando Music Award for Best hard/Edge Band every year it was awarded and are consistently at the top of the Best Metal category in the Orlando Weekly's annual "Best of Orlando" feature. Gargamel! have played shows with such National acts as Anthrax, GWAR, Tub Ring, Nonpoint, Dog Fashion Disco, Bad Acid Trip, Mushroomhead and many others.  They are also annual featured performers at many of Orlando's major Horror Movie/Sci-Fi conventions such as Screamfest and TachyceCon.

Band members
Mandaddy - Neck (1992–present)
Crazy Hector - 4 and 5 Strings (1995–present)
Servo Beonic Man - Digital Manipulations (1995–present)
Professor Knuckles - 6 Strings (2000–present)
Heavie Kevie  - Stick Man (2011–present)

Former members
Webb - Drums (1992–2006)
El Diablo Guapo - Guitar (1996–2000)
Skyjak - Guitar (1992–1996)
Boy Howdy - Bass (1992–1995)
Headless Spawn - Guitar (1992–1994)
MAS - Beats (2006–2011)

Discography

All music by Gargamel! and all lyrics by Mandaddy unless otherwise noted.

Studio albums

Revulva (1997)
Track listing

Touch My Fun (2000)
Track listing

The New Tenderness (2003)
Track listing

Fields of Happy (2007)
Track listing

Live albums

Live Bootleg (1999)
Track listing

Gargalive! (2005)

EPs

First Date Music (2009)

Remix albums

What's That Smell? Gargamel! The Remixes (2004)

References

Various authors. "Atlantis: Unsigned Artists Step Into The Spotlight." Metal Edge, December 2002, pp. 84–85.

External links
Official website
MySpace site
Gargamel! Unmasked - Interview with the Orlando Weekly
1999 Orlando Music Awards - Best in Hard Rock/Heavy Metal
Gargamel! Artist Profile - Orlando Weekly profile
Gargamel! Revulva - Review by Ink19 magazine

American experimental rock groups
American funk metal musical groups
Funk rock musical groups
Crossover (music)
Musical groups from Orlando, Florida